The Beautiful Miller is a 1954 West German romantic drama film directed by Wolfgang Liebeneiner and starring Waltraut Haas, Gerhard Riedmann and Hertha Feiler.

It was made at the Tempelhof Studios in West Berlin. The film's sets were designed by the art directors Willi Herrmann and Heinrich Weidemann. It was shot using Gevacolor.

Cast
 Waltraut Haas as Inge Kunze
 Gerhard Riedmann as Fritz Mertens
 Hertha Feiler as Hilde Rüdiger, 'Die schöne Müllerin'
 Katharina Mayberg as Kat Dramberger
 Paul Hörbiger as Albert Krügler
 Fritz Wagner as Anton Vogt
 Margarete Haagen as Josefine Krügler
 Willy Rösner as Walter Kunze, Erlenbachwirt
 Wolfgang Neuss as Sepp
 Marina Ried as Sekretärin Ursl
 Paul Westermeier as Hermann Knorr
 Albert Florath as Dramberger, Organist
 Harald Paulsen as Mühlenkonsort
 Käthe Itter as Lina
 Sepp Rist as Kriminalinspektor
 Carla Rust as Frau Rüdiger
 Ursula Voß as Rosl
 Karola Ebeling
 Gisela Griffel as Sängerin

References

Bibliography
 Bock, Hans-Michael & Bergfelder, Tim. The Concise CineGraph. Encyclopedia of German Cinema. Berghahn Books, 2009.

External links 
 

1954 films
1954 romantic drama films
German romantic drama films
West German films
1950s German-language films
Films directed by Wolfgang Liebeneiner
Constantin Film films
Films shot at Tempelhof Studios
1950s German films